Sergey Khachatryan (also spelled Sergei Khachatryan) (born 5 April 1985 in Yerevan) is an Armenian violinist. Since 1993 he has lived in Germany where he gave his first orchestral concert at the age of nine in the Kurhaus, Wiesbaden.

He made his New York City debut on 4 August 2006, playing the Beethoven Violin Concerto in Avery Fisher Hall under the baton of Osmo Vänskä. In June 2013, he played Shostakovich's first Violin Concerto with the Seattle Symphony and Ludovic Morlot conducting.

Prizes
2000: 1st prize at the International Louis Spohr Competition for Young Violinists
2000: 1st prize at the International Jean Sibelius Violin Competition (he is the youngest person who ever won)
2000: 2nd prize at the International Fritz Kreisler Competition
2002: 2nd prize at the Indianapolis International Violin Competition
2005: 1st prize at the Queen Elisabeth Music Competition
2008: The Medal of Movses Khorenatsi (Armenia)
2010: Beethoven Ring Bonn
2012: Merited Artist of Armenia
2014: Awarded the 'Credit Suisse Young Artist Award' and was granted $82,000
At the Queen Elisabeth Competition, he won the 1708 "Huggins" Stradivarius violin on loan to him from the Nippon Music Foundation for four years.

Currently, he is using 1740 Guarneri Del Gesù Ysaÿe violin on loan to him from the Nippon Music Foundation.

Recordings

He has six CDs at Naïve Records:
Sibelius – Violin Concerto/Khachaturian – Violin Concerto
Shostakovich – Violin Concerto 1, Op. 77, No. 2, Op. 129
Franck – Violin Sonata in A major/ Shostakovich – Violin Sonata, Op. 134
J. S. Bach: Sonatas & Partitas, BWV 1001–1006 (2010)
Johannes Brahms - Violin Sonatas Nos 1 - 3, with Lusine Khachatryan, piano (2012)
 My Armenia - Komitas Krunk (The Crane) - Tsirani Tsar (Apricot Tree) - Seven Folk Dances.  Edvard Mirzoyan Introduction & Perpetuum Mobile.  Aram Khachaturian Two dances from ballet Gayaneh.  Arno Babajanian Six Pictures for Piano Solo.  Edvard Baghdasaryan Rhapsody. (2016)

He has a debut CD at EMI Classics, released October 7, 2002. Among the works on this CD are the Brahms D minor sonata and Ravel's Tzigane, both performed with pianist Lusine Khachatryan, his sister, as well as Chausson's Poeme and Waxman's Carmen Fantasy, both performed with pianist Vladimir Khachatryan, his father.

References

Further reading

External links
 Official website

1985 births
Armenian classical violinists
Living people
Musicians from Yerevan
Prize-winners of the Queen Elisabeth Competition
Armenian emigrants to Germany
International Jean Sibelius Violin Competition prize-winners
21st-century classical violinists